Aichiken Forest Park is a forest park located in the area encompassing Owariasahi and Moriyama-ku, Nagoya, Aichi. In its vast forest of about 468 hectares, it also includes a botanical garden and various sports facilities, such as tennis courts, baseball and archery fields, a horse riding course, a golf course, and sports plazas. 

The park opened in 1934 as Japan's first forest park.

See also 
Forest park

References

External links 

Official site (in Japanese and English)

Owariasahi, Aichi
Forest parks in Japan
1934 establishments
Parks and gardens in Nagoya
Tourist attractions in Nagoya